The Ambassador of Great Britain to the Holy Roman Emperor was the foremost diplomatic representative of the Kingdom of Great Britain, a state created in 1707 by the Union of England and Scotland, to the Holy Roman Emperor. The Embassy was a prestigious posting in the British foreign service.

For the ambassadors from the Court of St. James's up to 1707, see List of ambassadors of the Kingdom of England to the Holy Roman Emperor and for the period since 1800, see List of Ambassadors from the United Kingdom to Austria.

List of heads of mission

Envoys-Extraordinary and Ambassadors to the Holy Roman Emperor
 1707–1709: Sir Philip Meadowes Envoy Extraordinary
 1707–1708 and 1709–1711: Maj.-Gen. Francis Palmes Envoy Extraordinary
 1710–1711: Charles Mordaunt, 3rd Earl of Peterborough Special Mission
 1711–1714: Simon Clement Chargé d'Affaires
 1711: Charles Whitworth Ambassador
 1712–1713: Abraham Stanyan (not in Vienna)
1714: James Stahope sent with Baron Cobham
 1714–1715: Richard Temple, 1st Baron Cobham
 1715: George Carpenter, 1st Baron Carpenter (appointed but did not go)
 1715–1716: Luke Schaub in charge
 1716–1718: Abraham Stanyan
 Robert Sutton, 2nd Baron Lexinton (1718) 
 1718: Luke Schaub and :fr:François-Louis de Pesmes de Saint-Saphorin Chargés d'Affaires
 1718–1727: :fr:François-Louis de Pesmes de Saint-Saphorin Chargé d'Affaires
 1719–1720: The Earl Cadogan Ambassador Extraordinary and Plenipotentiary
 1721: Colonel Charles Churchill Special Mission
 1721–1724: Francis Colman Secretary
 1724–1725: Charles Harrison Minister or Resident
 1726–1727: George Woodward Secretary
 1727–1730: James Waldegrave, 1st Earl Waldegrave Ambassador
 1730–1748: Thomas Robinson Minister Plenipotentiary (but sometimes called Envoy Extraordinary)
 1742–1747: James Porter Commissary
 1742–1743: Thomas Villiers Special Mission
 1748–1757: Robert Keith (d. 1774) Minister 1748–1753; then Minister Plenipotentiary
 1752: John Carmichael, 3rd Earl of Hyndford Special Mission
 1757–1763: No diplomatic relations due to Seven Years' War

Envoys-Extraordinary and Ministers-Plenipotentiary to the Holy Roman Emperor

 1763–1772: David Murray, Viscount Stormont Ambassador
 1772–1792: Robert Murray Keith (the younger)
 1790: The Earl of Elgin Envoy-Extraordinary
 1792–1793 The Earl of Elgin
 1793–1794 Sir Morton Eden
 1794: George Spencer, 2nd Earl Spencer Ambassador-Extraordinary
 1794–1798: Sir Morton Eden (again)
 1799–1801: Gilbert, Earl of Minto

References

Holy Roman Emperor
Lists of ambassadors to the Holy Roman Emperor
Ambassadors
Ambassadors
Ambassadors
Ambassadors
Ambassadors
Ambassadors
Ambassadors
Ambassadors